The Castaways is an Australian television drama adventure series which first screened on the ABC in 1974.

Cast
 Peter Gwynne as Sergeant Holt
 Fred Haltiner as Jan Lindburg
 Volker Eckstein as Mr Fletcher
 Isobel Black as Cathy Dunbar
 Renate Schroeter as Eve Lindburg
 John Bowman as Billy Rose
 Don Barkham as Irving
 Lexia Wilson as Angie
 Alan Cinis as David

References

External links
The Castaways at Classic Australian TV

Australian Broadcasting Corporation original programming
1974 Australian television series debuts
Australian drama television series
English-language television shows